Paul Sjöberg (14 July 1897 – 16 March 1978) was a Finnish sailor who competed in the 1952 Summer Olympics.

References

1897 births
1978 deaths
Finnish male sailors (sport)
Olympic sailors of Finland
Olympic bronze medalists for Finland
Olympic medalists in sailing
Sailors at the 1952 Summer Olympics – 6 Metre
Medalists at the 1952 Summer Olympics